{{Automatic taxobox
| image = Bouea macrop Fr 080109-3217 tdp.jpg
| image_caption = fruit of B. macrophylla
| taxon = Bouea
| authority = Meisn.
| synonyms = * Cambessedea Wight & Arn.
 Haplospondias Kosterm.
 Manga Noronha
 Matpania Gagnep.
 Tropidopetalum Turcz.
}}Bouea is an Asian genus of fruiting trees in the family Anacardiaceae.  Species can be found in southern China, Indo-China and Malesia.

 Species 
Plants of the World Online and the Catalogue of Life list:
 Bouea macrophylla Griff. (Thailand, Peninsular Malaysia, Sumatra, Java)
 Bouea oppositifolia (Roxb.) Meisn. - type species (throughout range)
 Bouea poilanei'' Evrard (Vietnam only)

References

External links 
 
 

 
Fruits originating in Asia
Trees of Indo-China
Trees of Malesia
Anacardiaceae genera
Taxa named by Carl Meissner